Benz & MD was a duo of Canadian electronic music DJs and producers Greg Benz and Marco Di Carlo, both graduates of the well-known BealArts program at London, Ontario's H. B. Beal Secondary School.  They began recording together in 2003, releasing singles mainly on Aurium Recordings and Release Records,  plus Silver Planet, and Baroque Records ("Underoath").
Their 2004 track "Release Time" was recorded by Flash Brothers. "Sound 64" was recorded in collaboration with Ebrius and released by Aurium Recordings. The pair released a 12" vinyl with two versions of "Snowblind".

Their track "Turning The Curves" was included in the 2006 Markus Schulz album Ibiza '06. "Percasins' was included in the Groove spot Mix in 2006. A remix of the song "Vacant" was included in the 2008 album Hydra by the band Iris.

Discography
EPs & Singles
"Snowblind" (2003), Dorigen Music
"Oneric" (2003), Aurium Recordings
"Wonder" (2004), Hope Recordings
"Dilation" (2004), Release Records
"Radience" (2004), Release Records
"Spiagia" / "Tainted" (2004), Baroque Records
"Sound84" (2004), vs Ebrius, Aurium Recordings
"Still Rain" / "Dead Calm" (2004), Silver Planet Recordings
"Shudder" (2004), Basic Energy
"Unconditional" / "Mar Del Plata" (2005), Aurium Recordings
"Highroller" / "Redline" (2006), Electronic Elements
"Percasins" / "Open Bar" (2006), Aurium Recordings
"Turning The Curves" (2006), Electronic Elements
"Underoath" (2006), Baroque Records
"Visceral" (2006), Primal Recordings
"The Sundowner" (2007), Aurium Recordings
"Places" (2007), Aurium Recordings
"Subdivision" / "Places In Betwween" (2007), Aurium Recordings
"Sustain Release" /  "Departed" (2007), Aurium Recordings
Signals / Orion's Belt (2007), split EP with Stefan Anion, Proton Music
A Priori / Signals (2008), split EP with The Last Atlant, Proton Music
Robot / Ending (2008), split EP with Micah, Proton Particles
Alternate Ending / You Made Me Smile (2008), split EP with Michael Feihstel, Proton Particles
Restraint EP (2009), Aurium Recordings
The Patrol EP (2010), Aurium Recordings

Compilation inclusions
7 Year Itch! (History Of Hope Compilation), "Wonder" (2005), Hope Recordings
50 Trance Tunes Deluxe Volume 1, "Turning The Curves" (2008), Armada Digital
50 Trance Tunes Deluxe Volume 2, "Highroller" (2009), Armada Digital

References

External links
Discogs entry

Canadian electronic music groups